Up the Dose is American heavy metal band The Mentors' second studio album. The cover features adult model and singer Candye Kane.

Track listing

Personnel
 El Duce — drums, lead vocals
 Sickie Wifebeater — guitar, backing vocals
 Dr. Heathen Scum — bass, backing vocals

External links
 Up the Dose at Discogs

1986 albums
Mentors (band) albums